The Lower Hudson Transit Link, commonly known as Hudson Link, is a bus rapid transit service which began on October 29, 2018, operating between several locations in Rockland County, New York, and over the Tappan Zee Bridge, to serve Tarrytown and White Plains in Westchester County, New York. It replaced the former Tappan Zee Express bus, which ran between White Plains, Tarrytown, and Suffern. The bus service is often referred simply to as the "Hudson Link". The bus is operated by Transdev under contract to the New York State Department of Transportation.

The fare for a single ride is $2.75, which can be in cash on buses or by credit card at machines located at bus stops. A single ride with a transfer is $3.75, which allows for connections (within two hours) to Transport of Rockland, Clarkstown Mini-Trans, or Bee-Line Bus. A special $1.00 fare exists for those using the bus only in Tarrytown, between Elizabeth Street and the Metro North Station.

History

The Lower Hudson Transit Link was developed to help relieve the traffic conditions on travel between Rockland & Westchester Counties, as well as plan for future population growth. The initial plan by the Mass Transit Task Force was published in 2014 when the Tappan Zee Bridge was going to be replaced with what was then called the New NY Bridge (now the Mario Cuomo Bridge). The initial plan consisted seven services, provide intercounty and intracounty service to Rockland and Westchester Counties, and the New York City borough of The Bronx. All these routes would operate along dedicated bus lane segments, with Traffic Signal Priority:

Red: Suffern to White Plains or Westchester County Airport
Blue: Spring Valley to Yonkers
Green: Spring Valley to Tarrytown (Peak Service Only)
Navy: Tarrytown to White Plains
Gold: White Plains to Bedford Park
Platinum: White Plains to Port Chester
Purple: White Plains to Westchester Medical Center (Valhalla)

The initial plans were changed as a result of Rockland residents complaining about the loss of direct access to Tarrytown. Although residents were told that service to White Plains would result in a faster trip on the combined Hudson Link/Metro North connection to New York City, many did believe that was possible because White Plains is seven miles from Tarrytown, and the buses would operate along heavy I-287 traffic during the rush hours. That consequently set up complaints from Tarrytown residents about too many buses running in the neighborhood. One of the major changes was that four routes (and one express variant) would make up the system, instead of the seven proposed. The proposed red service was truncated to Palisades Center as a shuttle (which is the current HO1 service). Nyack got two daily bus routes heading towards Tarrytown and White Plains.

The other proposed routes from the 2014 study have become future provisions of the network, which will be expanded on "as ridership warrants". There are some initiative to roll out the White Plains-Port Chester service (proposed Platinum route), but no implementation schedule is set for that, or the other future provisions.

Bus fleet
The Hudson Link bus service uses 31 Prevost X3-45 buses, numbered R801-R831. Buses have free Wi-Fi and USB ports. Buses are also equipped with bike racks. Buses sport the New York State colors, with the Hudson Link and NYSDOT logos on the sides and at the front of the bus. All buses are wheelchair accessible.

List of routes

The Lower Hudson Transit Link operates several routes:

References

External links 
Hudson Link Website 
NYSDOT Lower Hudson Transit Link Website

Transportation in Rockland County, New York
Bus transportation in New York (state)
Surface transportation in Greater New York
2018 establishments in New York (state)
Bus rapid transit in New York (state)